Marc Batchelor (4 January 1970 – 15 July 2019) was a South African professional footballer who played as a striker.

Career
Born in Johannesburg on 4 January 1970, Batchelor spent his early career with Wanderers, Balfour Park, Berea Park and Defence. He joined Dynamos in 1990, and later played for Bidvest Wits, Orlando Pirates, SuperSport United, Kaizer Chiefs, Mamelodi Sundowns and Moroka Swallows.

He won four major trophies with Orlando Pirates, including the 1995 African Cup of Champions Clubs.

Later life and death
After retiring from professional football in 2003, Batchelor worked as a television pundit. However, he was fired in 2007 after a fight in a restaurant.

In 2014 Batchelor was a witness in the trial of Oscar Pistorius.

He was murdered outside his home in Olivedale on 15 July 2019.

See also
List of unsolved murders

References

1970 births
2019 deaths
Association football forwards
Berea Park F.C. players
Bidvest Wits F.C. players
Deaths by firearm in South Africa
Dynamos F.C. (South Africa) players
Kaizer Chiefs F.C. players
Male murder victims
Mamelodi Sundowns F.C. players
Moroka Swallows F.C. players
Orlando Pirates F.C. players
People murdered in South Africa
South African murder victims
South African Premier Division players
South African soccer players
South African television personalities
SuperSport United F.C. players
Unsolved murders in Africa
White South African people